Tisis elegans is a moth in the family Lecithoceridae. It was described by Snellen in 1903. It is found on Java.

The wingspan is 17–19 mm. There is a widely expanded golden yellow area extending beyond the median band on the forewings.

References

Moths described in 1903
Tisis